Aftab Sachak (born 16 July 1952) is an African British actor. He went to an English public school before studying acting.

He made his television debut in King of the Ghetto in 1986 and played the serious minded shop keeper, Ashraf Karim, in the BBC soap opera, EastEnders (1987–1990). Since leaving EastEnders he has appeared in the BBC comedy Waiting for God (1993), Brothers in Trouble (1995), Call Red (1996), Out of Sight (1996–1998), The Bill (1999), Hope & Glory (2000), The League of Extraordinary Gentlemen (2003) and Second Generation (2003) among others. On stage, Sachak's has appeared in Ayub Khan-Din's production of East Is East at the Octagon Theatre, Bolton, in 2005.

Whilst appearing in EastEnders, Sachak was declared bankrupt after incurring gambling debts, which led to him being evicted from his home. Sachak has commented: "I felt like I was stuck in hell, I even thought about suicide."

Sachack, defendant #T20111217-1, was committed for trial for fraud and other offences on 22 September 2011 at Ealing Magistrates Court and the case was finally determined on 24 August 2012. A confiscation and forfeiture order under the Proceeds of Crime Act 2002 was made against Sachak together with a custodial sentence for 3 years imprisonment. He pleaded guilty and was convicted for two crimes between 15 January 2007 and 31 December 2009 committed whilst on bail for another offence.

References

External links

Court file = http://dl.dropbox.com/u/55096653/aftab%20sachak.pdf

1952 births
Afghan emigrants to England
British male actors of South Asian descent
British male soap opera actors
Living people